Sjeng Schalken was the defending champion but did not compete that year.

Gustavo Kuerten won in the final 3–6, 6–2, 6–3 against Agustín Calleri.

Seeds

Draw

Finals

Top half

Bottom half

References
 2004 Brasil Open Draw

Singles
Singles